The Liberal Party is any of many political parties around the world. The meaning of liberal varies around the world, ranging from liberal conservatism on the right to social liberalism on the left.


Active liberal parties

This is a list of existing and active Liberal Parties worldwide with a name similar to "Liberal party".

Defunct liberal parties

See also
 
 Liberalism by country, for a list of liberal parties, such as:
 Democratic Liberal Party (disambiguation)
 Liberal Democratic Party (disambiguation)
 Liberal People's Party (disambiguation)
 Liberal Reform Party (disambiguation)
 National Liberal Party (disambiguation)
 New Liberal Party (disambiguation)
 Progressive Liberal Party (disambiguation)
 Radical Liberal Party (disambiguation)
 Social Liberal Party (disambiguation)
 Free Democratic Party (disambiguation)
 Radical Party (disambiguation)
 Freedom Party
 Partido Liberal (disambiguation)
 Liberal government, a list of Australian, Canadian, and British Liberal governments
 Liberal International
 Liberal Party leadership election (disambiguation)